Cor Scorpii ("Scorpion's Heart" in Latin) is a black metal band from Sogndal, Norway, founded in 2004 by Gaute Refsnes, the former keyboardist of Windir. Cor Scorpii is an alternative name of Antares, the 15th brightest star in the sky. The name was chosen because the band members felt that it conveyed a mysterious and atmospheric feeling, corresponding to the musical and lyrical content.

History
Cor Scorpii was formed in late 2004 after the death of Terje Bakken, the lead singer and founder of Windir. Following a farewell concert, the band was dissolved. At that point, Gaute Refsnes implemented the long-standing idea of creating his own band. Two other former Windir members, Stian Bakketeig and Jørn Holen, joined the band. Holen, however had to leave in 2005 due to family reasons and his obligations to Vreid, another band created by the former Windir members. The line-up was competed by Thomas S. Øvstedal, Rune Sjøthun, and Inge Jonny Lomheim, who have all been involved in the local metal scene for years. The band's first demo, Attergangar, was released in 2005, receiving much praise from the musical critics and fans and winning the Demo of the Month award from the Metal Hammer Germany magazine. Shortly after, the band signed a record deal with the Dutch label Descent Productions. A new drummer, Ole "Vargon" Nordsve, joined the band by the end of 2006. In July 2007, the band commenced to record its début full-length album, Monument, which was released on March 26, 2008 to positive reviews.

In 2009, Cor Scorpii was signed by the Norwegian label Dark Essence Records, which re-released the band's début album, as well as the earlier demo. The band's second album Ruin was released on June 15, 2018.

Musical style
Compared to Vreid, the legacy of Windir in Cor Scorpii's music, which is melodic and sombre, is apparent, even though no band member was actually involved in songwriting for Windir. There are notable differences as well, however. The folk influences, characteristic of Windir, were replaced with classical influences. Such classical composers as Sergei Prokofiev, Edvard Grieg, Sergei Rachmaninov, and Erik Satie are stated as sources of inspiration for the band.

Live performance
Cor Scorpii's first concert took place in their hometown in October 2007 during the Støy Festival; the band continued to tour Norway the following year, participating in larger events, such as the Inferno Metal Festival. In 2009, the band was able to perform outside their native country for the first time, playing in the Netherlands and then at the Ragnarök Festival in Germany.

Members

Current
 Thomas S. Øvstedal – vocals
 Erlend Nybø – guitars
 Rune Sjøthun – rhythm guitars
 Inge Jonny Lomheim – bass
 Gaute Refsnes – keyboards
 Ole "Vargon" Nordsve – drums

Former
 Jørn Holen – drums
 Stian Bakketeig – guitars

Discography

Albums
 Monument (2008)
 Ruin (2018)

Demos
 Attergangar (2005)

References

External links 
Official web-site
Official MySpace
Cor Scorpii at Dark Essence Records

Norwegian black metal musical groups
Musical groups established in 2004
2004 establishments in Norway
Musical groups from Sogn og Fjordane
Musicians from Sogndal